The Francoaceae are a small family of flowering plants in the order Geraniales, including the genera Francoa, commonly known as bridal wreaths, and Tetilla. The Francoaceae are recognized as a family under various classification schemes but under the APG III system the Francoaceae are included within the Melianthaceae. In the APG IV system the Francoaceae are again recognized as a family, with Melianthaceae included in the circumscription of Francoaceae.

The Francoaceae are herbaceous perennials characterized by a basal aggregation of alternate petiolated leaves. The leaf blades (lamina) are either dissected, or entire.

They are endemic to Chile.

Genera
Balbisia
Bersama
Francoa
Greyia
Melianthus
Rhynchotheca
Tetilla
Viviania

References

 
Rosid families
Flora of Chile